The Palazzo delle Esposizioni is a neoclassical exhibition hall, cultural center and museum on Via Nazionale in Rome, Italy.

History
Designed by Pio Piacentini, it opened in 1883.  It has housed several exhibitions (e.g. Mostra della Rivoluzione Fascista, Mostra Augustea della Romanità), but was temporarily modified during the Fascist era due to its style being thought to be out of step with the times.

The building is owned by the City of Rome and the gallery is administered by Azienda Speciale Palaexpo, an agency run by the City's Office for Education and Culture.
Für

Cinema
It incorporates a 139-seat cinema, a 90-seat auditorium, a café, a large, 240-place restaurant, a library and a multi-functional room known as the Forum.

Main exhibitions
Esposizione delle Belle Arti del 1883.
Exhibition on Garibaldi (1932)
Mostra della Rivoluzione Fascista (1932–1934)
 (1937)
Il socialismo è una malattia , Exhibition of the Competition of the Italian Federation of Artists and Professionals, FISAP - celebrating the Hungarian uprising against Communist Soviet Union  (May, 1957)
Quadriennale di Roma (1st - 4th, 6th - 10th, 12th, 13th and 15th)

Notes and references

External links 
Official Palazzo delle Esposizioni website
 

Buildings and structures in Rome
Art museums and galleries in Rome
Museums in Rome
Convention centers in Italy
Esposizioni
Cultural infrastructure completed in 1883
Rome R. I Monti
Contemporary art galleries in Italy